Richard Comeau (born 1960) is a Canadian film editor.

He won the Genie Award for Best Editing two years in a row, for The Necessities of Life in 2008 and Polytechnique in 2009. He also won the Jutra Award for Gabrielle (2013)  and was nominated for My Internship in Canada in 2016.

Filmography
His films include:

Awards and nominations

References

External links

1960 births
Canadian film editors
Best Editing Genie and Canadian Screen Award winners
Living people